BeBe & CeCe Winans is the second studio album by American gospel singing duo BeBe & CeCe Winans, released in 1987 on Capitol Records. The album reached number 12 on the Billboard Top Gospel Albums chart, and features the hit singles "Change Your Nature", "I.O.U. Me" and "Love Said Not So". CeCe Winans won a Grammy Award for Best Soul Gospel Performance, Female for the song "For Always."

Track listing

Personnel 
 BGVs arranged by  BeBe Winans, CeCe Winans, Keith Thomas and Marvin Winans
 BeBe Winans – lead and backing vocals 
 CeCe Winans – lead and backing vocals 
 Angie Winans, BeBe Winans, CeCe Winans, Constance Jackson, Debra K. Winans, Debra R. Winans, Kevin Jackson, Michael Winans, Regina Winans, Ronald Winans and Vicki Winans – additional backing vocals
 The Winans – backing vocals (2, 7)

Musicians
 Keith Thomas – keyboards, string arrangements
 Derrick Lee – acoustic piano (10)
 BeBe Winans – organ (10)
 Tom Hemby – guitars
 Jimmie Lee Sloas – bass 
 Mark Hammond – drums, drum programming 
 Mark Douthit – saxophone

Production 
 Producer – Keith Thomas 
 Executive Producers – Michael Brown and Wayne Edwards
 Production Assistance – Brett Perry
 Recorded and Mixed by Jeff Balding
 Assistant Engineers – Bill Heath, Michael Koreba and Billy Whitington.
 Recorded at Gold Mine Studio East (Brentwood, TN); OmniSound Studios Hummingbird Studios and Bullet Recording Studios (Nashville, TN).
 Mixed at OmniSound Studios and Digital Recorders (Nashville, TN).
 Mastered by Steve Hall at Future Disc (Hollywood, CA).
 Art Direction and Design – Kevin Hossman
 Photography – Mark Tucker

Charts 

Singles

References

1987 albums
BeBe & CeCe Winans albums